Sandra Pamela Pulido Ramírez (born 8 October 1987, Monterrey, Nuevo León) is a Mexican writer and screenwriter. She studied Communication Sciences at the Monterrey Institute of Technology and Higher Education (ITESM) Monterrey campus and later specialized in Cinema Screenplays at the Center for Cinematographic Training (CCC). She is the author of a children's book titled El Misterioso Aire Azul (2016).

Work 
El Misterioso Aire Azul (2016)

References

1987 births
Living people
Writers from Monterrey
Mexican women screenwriters